Bystry Rów is a stream that flows within the bounds of the municipality of Szczecin, Poland.

Rivers of Poland